Perozdukht (also spelled Perozduxt) was a late 5th-century Sasanian princess, who was captured after the defeat and death of her father Peroz I by the forces of the Hephthalite ruler Akhshunwar in 484. Perozdukht afterwards became a member of the Hephthalite court and bore the Hephthalite king a daughter, who later married Peroz I's son Kavad I.

References

Sources 
 
  

5th-century Iranian people
Sasanian princesses
Hephthalites
Prisoners of war